Great British Ghosts is a paranormal series that recounts stories of reported ghost sightings from some of the "most haunted" locations in the United Kingdom. It is presented by Michaela Strachan and was first aired on 18 August 2011. The first series of eight episodes told the stories of alleged sightings and paranormal activity at specific locations. All the episodes were aired in one night. It aired on Yesterday, part of UKTV. A second series of Great British Ghosts premiered on 24 August 2012 on Yesterday with a double bill. There were 12 episodes in the second series. In October 2012 a Halloween special was also aired. The series was originally commissioned for Yesterday's now closed sister channel Blighty. Repeats of the show are broadcast on Drama.

Episodes

References

External links

2011 British television series debuts
2012 British television series endings
Paranormal television
British ghosts
British supernatural television shows
English-language television shows
Television shows set in the United Kingdom